Schlechter is a family surname of German origin, which literally means “worse”. Notable people with this surname:

 Carl Schlechter (1874–1918), Austrian chess master
 Emanuel Schlechter (1906–1943), Polish lyricist, composer, writer
 Lambert Schlechter (born 1941), Luxembourg author
 Rudolf Schlechter (1872–1925), German taxonomist

German-language surnames
Surnames from nicknames